Fidibus is a Danish film by Hella Joof from 2006. It was first presented at the Roskilde Festival in the summer of 2006, but not did not debut in cinemas until October 13.

Starring
Rudi Køhnke as Kalle, the main character
Jonatan Spang, a Danish stand-up comedian, as Kalle's friend Agger
Jesper "Jokeren" Dahl, a Danish rapper, as the dealer Paten

Plot
Kalle, who is studying at the university, and his friend Agger eventually lose some hash that originally belongs to Paten (Abbreviation for "psykopaten", "the psychopath"). However, straight after Paten goes to jail, Kalle falls in love with his ignorant girlfriend Sabrina, though he has been warned not to touch Paten's money, girl(s) or car.

External links
 Official Danish website
 

2006 films
2006 comedy films
Danish comedy films